The following highways are numbered 367:

Brazil
 BR-367

Canada
Manitoba Provincial Road 367
 Quebec Route 367
Saskatchewan Highway 367

India
 National Highway 367 (India)

Japan
 Japan National Route 367

United States
  Arkansas Highway 367
  County Road 367 (Wakulla County, Florida)
  County Road 367A (Wakulla County, Florida)
  Georgia State Route 367 (former)
  Maryland Route 367
  Missouri Route 367
  New York State Route 367
  Ohio State Route 367 (former)
  Pennsylvania Route 367
  Puerto Rico Highway 367
  Tennessee State Route 367
  Virginia State Route 367